"Mon Amour" is a song recorded by Spanish singer-songwriter Zzoilo. Written by himself alongside Víctor Galindo and produced by the latter one, it was independently released as Zzoilo's debut single on December 30, 2020, from his upcoming debut studio album. After reaching an unexpected growth in streaming platforms during the following year, a remix featuring Spanish singer Aitana was released on August 17 through Universal Music to boost the record even more. Sung primarily in Spanish but also incorporating French, Euskara, Italian, Portuguese and English, lyrically, "Mon Amour" talks about being deeply in love with a partner. Zzoilo described the track as "good vibes and no drama".

The original solo version entered the Spanish charts in July, debuting at 71 and had peaked at five and was certified gold before the release of the remix. The duet version debuted at 58 with only two days of tracking. It eventually topped the chart for six consecutive weeks and was certified four times platinum. "Mon Amour" charted in Latin American countries during fall mainly through TikTok, entering the charts in Ecuador, Mexico etc., where the song peaked at number one on their respective Spotify Top 50 lists.

Background 
Originally conceived as a solo song, "Mon Amour" was written in one hour in the evening sometime in October 2020. Zzoilo stated to El Español that "it was born one night when he couldn't sleep, I picked up the guitar and started playing the four simplest chords in the world, with which the vast majority of catchy and simple songs have been written. The lyrics came to me alone. It was five in the morning and the lyrics started like this, although when I finished it, it was six o'clock and I changed it." After being sent to VGBases, a close friend of Tuñón, the track went through a lot of recording stages, trying a vast majority of genres to fit the lyrics from reggaeton to rap and acoustic. The final version was recorded in seven hours.

Remix 
After the song started to become more popular, singer Aitana tweeted the lyrics to the track on July 25. Both artists interacted on social media about a possible collaboration, which ended up being the remix to "Mon Amour". The Instagram private message conversation between the two is reflected in the single's cover. The duet was recorded in Madrid on July 30. Zzoilo later told the press that Aitana's work during 2020 and her sophomore album 11 Razones were a huge inspiration for the final conception of the song. He stated "we played her latest album because the drums seemed spectacular to us and we wanted to make the song in that style. In the end, it did not stay that way. But Aitana has been part of Mon Amour from the beginning". The remix was finally released on August 17 to commercial success.

Commercial performance 
"Mon Amour" has been charting on the Spanish music charts ever since July 5, 2021, and, on the week of August 13, it peaked at number five. The song was certified Gold that same week and Platinum the week after. The remix entered the chart at number 58 with only two days of tracking, jumping to the second position the following week. "Mon Amour (Remix)" reached the top position on the PROMUSICAE chart in its third week, becoming the number one song in the country for six consecutive weeks. It became Zzoilo's first-ever number one song and Aitana's fourth after "Lo Malo", "Teléfono" and "Vas a Quedarte". She hadn't had a number one song since 2018. Subsequently, the remix rose to number 1 on the Spotify Spain chart and entered the top 200 on the worldwide Spotify charts. In addition, in the week of September 25 it rose to number 1 on the list of Los 40.

Live performances 
Zzoilo performed "Mon Amour" on his gigs and concerts throughout the year. Aitana also added the track to the setlist of her 11 Razones Tour. They performed the song together for the first time during the singer's concert in Murcia. The first televised performance of "Mon Amour" happened during the 2021 Los40 Music Awards.

Charts

Weekly charts

Year-end charts

Certifications

Release history

References 

2021 songs
2021 singles
Aitana (singer) songs
Number-one singles in Spain